"Parallel Universe" is a radio promotional single by the Red Hot Chili Peppers from their 1999 album Californication and was released in 2001 as the album's sixth and final single. Although it never was released as a tangible CD single, it charted on the US Modern Rock Tracks at number 37 during the week of March 24, 2001, and appeared on Greatest Hits.

Background
Although being one of the album's loudest songs in terms of distortion, it does not contain any of the Chili's signature funk-orientated bass lines which they had been primarily known for in the past. Anthony Kiedis' vocals are subdued during the verses, reflecting an approach towards melodic balladry, while similarly the song lyrically tackles darker, more introspective themes than those that the band generally had a reputation for. 

The song is also notable for its lack of backing vocals, which are on almost every other track on Californication. 

Despite only being a promotional single, "Parallel Universe" remains a live favorite in the band's setlists and has been performed over 230 times since its release, making it one of the band's most performed songs since its first performance in 1998. No music video was made for the single.

Personnel
Anthony Kiedis – vocals
John Frusciante – guitar
Flea – bass
Chad Smith – drums, shaker

Charts

References

Red Hot Chili Peppers songs
1999 songs
Song recordings produced by Rick Rubin
Songs written by Flea (musician)
Songs written by John Frusciante
Songs written by Chad Smith
Songs written by Anthony Kiedis

2000 singles